Blastobasis millicentae is a moth in the family Blastobasidae. It is found in south-eastern Kenya and South Africa. The habitat consists of coastal lowlands.

The length of the forewings is 4.1–4.5 mm. The forewings are pale brown on the basal two-thirds and brown intermixed brown scales tipped with white and pale brown scales on the distal one-third. The hindwings are pale brown.

The larvae feed on Hirtella zanzibarica.

Etymology
The species is named in honor of Millicent Okumu, who managed the laboratory insect-rearing program in Nairobi, Kenya.

References

Moths described in 2010
Blastobasis
Moths of Africa